Vertex Resource Group Ltd. (Vertex) is a publicly traded environmental services company based in Sherwood Park and is traded on the TSX Venture Exchange, under the stock symbol VTX. Terry Stephenson has been president since 2005.

The company has expanded through organic growth and acquisitions to provide services across Western Canada and within select regions of the United States.

History

1962 - 2012 
Vertex has roots dating back to 1962, the date in which the acquired company Three Star Trucking Ltd. was established.

2012 - Present 
In 2014, Vertex acquired Navus Environmental Inc. Vertex was also named a Gold Standard Winner of Canada's Best Managed Companies.
In 2015, Vertex acquired Ignite Energy Services Ltd., Glacier Ridge Ventures Ltd., and Tar Energy Services Ltd.

On October 18, 2017, Vertex became a publicly traded company with common shares traded on the Toronto Venture Stock Exchange.

In 2018, Vertex acquired HMA Land Services, Sonic Oilfield Services Ltd. TSL Industries, a private company providing hydrovac services to the Edmonton, Alberta region and Three Star Trucking Ltd.

Operations 
Vertex has 28 Office locations across North America including: Sherwood Park, Calgary, Alida, Calmar, Carlsbad, Dawson Creek, Edam, Fort McMurray, Fort Nelson, Fort St. John, Grande Prairie, Houston, Kindersley, Kola, Leduc, Lloydminster, Regina

Rycroft, Selkirk, Tulsa, Valleyview, Victoria, Watford City, Weyburn, Whitecourt

Industries Served 
Oil and Gas, Oil Sands, Petrochemical, Renewable Energy, Utilities, Agriculture, Forestry, Drilling, Midstream, Mining, Aggregate and Government

References 

Companies based in Alberta